Chris Walley (born 21 June 1995) is an Irish actor. He is best known for his role as Jock O'Keeffe in the comedy film The Young Offenders (2016), for which he won an IFTA Award, and its subsequent RTÉ and BBC Three series. He won a Laurence Olivier Award for his performance in The Lieutenant of Inishmore revival on the West End.

Early life 
Walley was born County Cork, Ireland, and raised in the area of Glanmire. He was a pupil of Christian Brothers College, Cork. Walley is a great-grandson of William Norton, former Tánaiste.

From an early age, Walley took an interest in Drama and Theatre studies, attending classes in the Gaiety School of Acting and the Cork School of Music. As a student in the Cork School of Music Walley was a member of their Youth Theatre group, performing in productions such as Anouilh's Antigone, as well as undertaking individual lessons under the tutelage of Trína Scott. Walley auditioned for the Royal Academy of Dramatic Art in London after completing his secondary education, however, he was unsuccessful in his application and instead began studying full-time at Cork School of Music as part of their BA in Drama and Theatre studies. The following year Walley re-auditioned for RADA, and was offered one of their coveted 28 places, ahead of 3,500 other applicants.

Career 
Prior to commencing third level education, Walley had auditioned for and won a role in an independent Irish film, set to be based and filmed locally in Cork. The resulting film, The Young Offenders, written and directed by Peter Foott, became the fastest Irish film to break the €1 million mark at the Irish box office in 2016. For his role as Jock, Walley was nominated for numerous awards, including the IFTA for Best Supporting Actor. With the popularity of the film, on 9 May 2017, it was confirmed that a six-episode television programme, based on the film with the same name, had been ordered by RTÉ. The first series began broadcasting on 1 February 2018, broadcast by RTÉ Two in Ireland and airing through the online television service BBC Three. With a popular and high reception, the series was recommissioned for a second series, the projected release date was not disclosed. For his role in the television series, Walley was awarded the IFTA for Best Male Performance - Television.

In 2018 Walley was cast alongside Aidan Turner in a revival of Martin McDonagh's play The Lieutenant of Inishmore, which opened at the Noël Coward Theatre in June of that same year. For his performance, Walley received exceptional reviews, with TimeOut London writing, 'in a uniformly strong cast, special praise should go to Walley. A virtual newcomer, he is excruciatingly brilliant as the mullet-clad Davey, who meets each new indignity heaped upon him with an impressive mix of resignation and hysteria', Broadway World saying that, 'you would never be able to guess this is his West End debut', and The New York Times stating, 'Chris Walley ... effortlessly conveys the illogical logic and perverse mundanity of the dialogue'. For this performance Walley was nominated for the Evening Standard Emerging Talent Award, and was selected as a BAFTA Breakthrough Brit, an initiative established by the British Academy of Film and Television Awards to foster the talents of up-and-coming members of the arts world by offering them mentorship for a year.

Filmography

Film

Television

Stage

Awards and nominations
In March 2019, along with his co star from The Young offenders, Alex Murphy, Walley was jointly nominated for Comedy Performance - Male at the Royal Television Society Awards.

References

Living people
21st-century Irish actors
Irish male film actors
Irish male television actors
People from County Cork
1995 births